Sieradz Land or Siradia is a historical region of Poland, the southeastern part of Greater Poland. It has been also the name of the administrative unit from 14th-18th centuries (former Duchy of Sieradz) of the same borders (and a little different from the Sieradz Voivodeship, which included furthermore smaller Wieluń Land); the sejmik used to be held in Szadek. It has been a part of Archdiocese of Gniezno, and Uniejów used to be a residence of the primate. It has 9,700 km2 and about 950,000 inhabitants. Its traditional capital is Sieradz, while other bigger cities are Piotrków Trybunalski (another historically important locality), Radomsko, Tomaszów Mazowiecki (partly in Łęczyca Land), Bełchatów, Zduńska Wola, and Pabianice (a suburb of Łódź). It lies at the Warta and on the left bank of Pilica rivers, and these are mainly forested areas.

After Poland regained its independence, these lands were included in the Łódź and Kielce provinces. On September 1, 1939, when the Third Reich launched its attack on Poland, nearby Wieluń was bombed and the area between the German border and the Warta River was occupied. Eventually, these lands were partly in the General Government and partly within the administration of the Third German Reich.

References 

History of Greater Poland
Regions of Poland
Historical geography
Ethnology